Benzylpotassium is an organopotassium compound with the formula C6H5CH2K. It is an orange powder. Like organo-alkali metal reagents in general, benzyl potassium is highly reactive, so much so that it reacts with most solvents.  It is highly air sensitive.

Synthesis
One early synthesis proceeds by two-step transmetallation reaction via p-tolylpotassium:
(CH3C6H4)2Hg  +  2 K   →   2 CH3C6H4K   +  Hg 
CH3C6H4K    →   KCH2C6H5
A modern synthesis involves the reaction of butyllithium, potassium tert-butoxide, and toluene.  Although potassium hydride can also be used as a strong base for preparing potassium salts, benzyl potassium has the advantage of being molecular and hence more fast-acting.

References

Potassium compounds
Benzyl compounds